Gizem Elmaağaçlı (born 4 November 1997) is a Turkish compound archer. She is a member of Kayseri Büyükşehir Belediyespor and part of the national team.

Career
Gizem Elmaağaçlı won the gold medal in the compound women event at the 2019 European Indoor Archery Championships held in Samsun, Türkiye.  She also won the bronze medal in the women's team compound event. Gizem received the invitational place to the Hyundai Archery World Cup Final held in Samsun at the end of the 2018 outdoor season. She lost her first match of that competition against eventual winner Sara Lopez.

References

1997 births
Living people
People from Kayseri
Turkish female archers
Universiade medalists in archery
Universiade silver medalists for Turkey
Universiade bronze medalists for Turkey
Medalists at the 2017 Summer Universiade
Medalists at the 2019 Summer Universiade
20th-century Turkish sportswomen
21st-century Turkish sportswomen